This is a list of members of the Congress of Deputies of Spain that were elected in the 1982 general election.

References

02
1982 in Spain